Lawrence "Larry" Schneider,  (born March 23, 1938) is a Canadian politician.

Born in Regina, Saskatchewan, he was mayor of Regina from 1979 until 1988. In the 1988 federal election, he was elected as a Progressive Conservative candidate in the riding of Regina—Wascana. Under Kim Campbell's government, from June 25, 1993 until November 3, 1993, he was Minister of Western Economic Diversification. He lost his seat in the 1993 election to Ralph Goodale.

He was president of the Prairie Implement Manufacturers' Association.

Schneider supported Conservative Party candidate Michael Kram in the riding of Regina-Wascana in the 2015 federal election.

Electoral record

Regina—Wascana

References 
Notes

Sources
 

1938 births
Living people
Mayors of Regina, Saskatchewan
Members of the 25th Canadian Ministry
Members of the House of Commons of Canada from Saskatchewan
Progressive Conservative Party of Canada MPs
Members of the King's Privy Council for Canada